Naren is a given name in various cultures.

In Inner Mongolia, Naren is a Chinese transcription of the Mongolian word naran, meaning "sun".

People with this name include:
Naren Tamhane (1931–2002), Indian cricketer
Naren Ray (1940–2003), Indian Bengali cartoonist
Naren Bakshi (born 1943), Indian-born American entrepreneur
Naren Gupta (1948–2021), Indian venture capitalist
Naren Hua (born 1962), Chinese actress of Mongolian descent
Naren Shankar (born 1964), American screenwriter of Indian descent
Naren Weiss (born 1991), American actor of Indian descent
Naren Reddy (born 1994), Indian cricketer
Naren Solano (born 1996), Colombian football forward

References

Unisex given names